Pay Kuh-e Sefid (also Romanized as Pāy Kūh-e Sefīd) is a village in Howmeh Rural District, in the Central District of Kahnuj County, Kerman Province, Iran. At the 2006 census, its population was 81, in 20 families.

References 

Populated places in Kahnuj County